"Put Your Hearts Up" is the debut single by American singer Ariana Grande. She released the song under Republic Records (at the time, Universal Republic Records) on December 12, 2011. The song samples "What's Up?" (1993) by 4 Non Blondes.

Background
"Put Your Hearts Up" was written by Matt Squire, Linda Perry and Martin Johnson.
Grande began working on her debut album while she was filming Victorious and formally started to work on it with a record label after she was signed to Universal Republic Records on August 10, 2011. By September 10, Grande already had twenty songs prepared and was going through the process of narrowing it down to thirteen. It was released as her first single on December 12, 2011, despite not appearing on her debut album Yours Truly. It is a "50s, 60s doo-wop-inspired" bubblegum pop song which talks about making the world a better place.

Release and cover
Grande decided to let her fans be a part of choosing the single's artwork by showing four possible covers for the single via her account on Twitter. After the fans voted, the cover was chosen and the release date for the single was announced via Ariana Grande's Twitter account on November 29, 2011. "Put Your Hearts Up" was originally going to be released on December 20, 2011, but was later decided to be released earlier. "Put Your Hearts Up" premiered on On Air with Ryan Seacrest on December 9, 2011 and became available for digital download through iTunes three days later.

After release
In a 2012 interview she said, "'Put Your Hearts Up' is the first single because it has a great message and, in some people’s opinion, is the best option for a newcomer, most commercial, yeah. You know, it screams 'newbie coming to town'. It’s kind of my, like, not like 'Genie In A Bottle', but it's my first single that is somewhat different and somewhat going with the flow for now."

In an interview on Kidd Kraddick in the Morning she said, "It was a learning experience for sure. Sonically it's just not my vibe. I think it would've been a great hit song for somebody else maybe, but it's just not what I like to sing. It's a bubblegum pop record for sure, and I like to sing stuff that's a little more soulful. I love pop music, I'm a huge pop music fan, but I just didn't think that that record was right for me." In an interview published in the August 2013 issue of Seventeen, Grande said, "It was bubblegum pop, which isn't me, but it was something I thought my fans wanted."

In an interview with Rolling Stone in 2014, Grande said that "Put Your Hearts Up" "was geared toward kids and felt so inauthentic and fake. That was the worst moment of my life. For the video, they gave me a bad spray tan and put me in a princess dress and had me frolic around the street. The whole thing was straight out of hell. I still have nightmares about it, and I made them hide it on my Vevo page."

In a 2020 interview with Zach Sang for Positions, Grande retracted her statements about "hating" the song, saying she felt she was in an uncomfortable position at the time about her music career and felt that her fans wanted to hear a bubblegum pop song due to her Cat persona on Victorious. She also went on to state that although she doesn't dislike the song, she felt it would have been a better fit for another artist interested in pursuing bubblegum pop as Grande had no interest in recording music of that genre.

Music video
The music video for "Put Your Hearts Up" was shot on November 23, 2011. It was directed by Meiert Avis and Jeremy Alter. On February 14, 2012, the official music video was uploaded on YouTube under ArianaGrandeVevo at a length of 3 minutes and 49 seconds. The video has gained more than 40 million views as of May 2014. In the video, Grande walks through the streets of a city sending love to lonely people while dancing and singing. Prior to this, the video had been uploaded by other channels.

Later in March 2013, when "The Way" music video was released, the music video for "Put Your Hearts Up" was made private on Grande's Vevo account at Grande's request. The video was then made public again in April 2014 and was deleted shortly after.

Commercial performance
The single sold 170,000 downloads by August 2013. On July 20, 2014 it was certified gold by the Recording Industry Association of America (RIAA), for combined sales and streams of 500,000 units in the US.

Certifications

References

2011 debut singles
2011 songs
Ariana Grande songs
Songs written by Ariana Grande
Songs written by Linda Perry
Songs written by Matt Squire
Songs written by Martin Johnson (musician)
Universal Republic Records singles
Music videos directed by Meiert Avis
Bubblegum pop songs